Martin Lorenzo Santiago (born June 8, 1987), who goes by Marty and sometimes Marty Mar, is an American rapper in the Christian hip hop genre. He is part of the duo, Social Club Misfits, with his partner, Fern. His first extended play, Marty for President, was released in 2015. This was his breakthrough release upon the Billboard magazine charts.

Early life
Santiago was born, Martin Lorenzo Santiago, on June 8, 1987, and he was raised in Broward County where he and Fernando established Social Club.

Music career
Marty's solo music recording career started in 2015, with the extended play, Marty for President, that was released on September 11, 2015, by Social Club. The extended play was his breakthrough release upon the Billboard magazine charts, where it placed on five charts, while it peaked at No. 64 on The Billboard 200, No. 1 on Christian Albums, No. 9 on Independent Albums, No. 7 on Rap Albums, and No. 14 on Digital Albums.

Discography
EPs

References

1987 births
Living people
American performers of Christian music
Musicians from Miami
Performers of Christian hip hop music
Rappers from Miami
21st-century American rappers